Ikaw sa Puso Ko (International title: In My Heart / ) is a 2004 Philippine television drama romance series broadcast by GMA Network. Directed by Ruel S. Bayani, it stars Nadine Samonte, Oyo Boy Sotto and James Blanco. It premiered on March 1, 2004 replacing Walang Hanggan on the network's afternoon line up. The series concluded on October 1, 2004 with a total of 153 episodes. It was replaced by Leya, ang Pinakamagandang Babae sa Ilalim ng Lupa in its timeslot.

Cast and characters
Lead cast
 Nadine Samonte as Sofia
 Oyo Boy Sotto as Anton
 James Blanco as Alfie

Supporting cast
 Charee Pineda as Mirasol
 Rita Avila
 Lotlot de Leon
 Amy Perez
 Ricardo Cepeda
 Alicia Alonzo
 Suzette Ranillo
 Nina Medina
 Gayle Valencia
 John Medina
 John Apacible
 Ali Alejandro
 Bettina Carlos
 Jj Zamora
 Malou Crisologo
 Gay Balignasay

References

External links
 

2004 Philippine television series debuts
2004 Philippine television series endings
Filipino-language television shows
GMA Network drama series
Philippine romance television series
Television series by TAPE Inc.
Television shows set in the Philippines